Abraham Oyanedel Urrutia (25 May 1874 in Copiapó – 29 January 1954) was Acting President of Chile in 1932.

He studied law at the Universidad de Chile in Santiago, and in 1897 received his law degree. During the 1891 Chilean Civil War, Oyanedel fought for the Congressional army.

In 1927, he was appointed a member of the Supreme Court of Chile , and served as Chief Justice. On October 2, due to the garrison revolts in Antofagasta and Concepción, Blanche resigned his power to Oyanedel.  Nearly all of Oyanedel's work was to convene the general elections, which were won by Arturo Alessandri for his second term in office. Oyanedel handed over the presidential power on Christmas Day, December 24, 1932. Oyanedel had led the country for 82 days from the position of Vice President of the Republic.

1874 births
1954 deaths
Chilean people of Basque descent
Presidents of Chile
Supreme Court of Chile members
People from Copiapó